Udea suisharyonensis is a moth in the family Crambidae. It was described by Strand in 1918. It is found in China and Taiwan.

References

suisharyonensis
Moths described in 1918